Stéphane Exartier (born 12 March 1969 in Chambéry) is a French former alpine skier who competed in the 1992 Winter Olympics.

He later competed for Poland.

External links
 sports-reference.com

1969 births
Living people
French male alpine skiers
Polish male alpine skiers
Olympic alpine skiers of France
Alpine skiers at the 1992 Winter Olympics
Sportspeople from Chambéry
20th-century French people